Yantan District is a district of the city of Zigong, Sichuan Province, China.

References

Districts of Sichuan
Zigong